Danny Dark (December 19, 1938 – June 13, 2004) was an American voice-over artist. For nearly four decades, he embedded pop culture with memorable lines in advertisements for Budweiser ("This Bud's for you"), Raid Ant & Roach Killer ("Raid - Kills Bugs Dead"), StarKist tuna ("Sorry, Charlie") and Parkay ("Parkay Margarine from Kraft. The flavor says 'butter'."). The trade paper Radio & Records said, "Dark's distinctive voice has been heard in more award-winning commercials than any announcer in broadcast history." He is known for voicing Superman in Super Friends.

Biography

Early life and career
Dark was born Daniel Melville Croskery in Oklahoma City, Oklahoma, but his family moved to Tulsa, shortly after. He attended Tulsa Central High School, where he studied under a well-known teacher of future performers, Isabelle Ronan.  He started in Missouri as a radio D.J. in the late 1950s, while studying at Drury University. He quickly advanced to stations in Cleveland, Miami, New Orleans, St. Louis, finally landing a 1963-66 stint as the evening DJ for KLAC in Los Angeles.

Notable voice-over work
Over the course of his career, Dark was the spokesman for Keebler Cookies, the Chevrolet Camaro, AT&T, Kmart, Texaco, Armor-All, Whitman's Chocolates, Dreyer's Ice Cream, and many other Blue Chip companies. Dark was the voice of the long-running TV western Bonanza, voicing their intermission commercials for the program's sponsor, Chevrolet. Dark was an announcer who came to be known as the "voice" of the CBS network during the 1970s and later, on the NBC television network during the 1980s and early 1990s, doing promo advertisements for night-time programming, as well as an announcer for NBC's flagship station, WNBC-TV, and the imaging voice for many of the network's affiliates and O&O stations for their local newscasts.  He also voiced the NBC News 1983 "Go Where The News Is" advertising campaign.

He voiced the role of Superman/Clark Kent for twelve years, from 1973 to 1985, in each of the various incarnations of Hanna-Barbera's animated series Super Friends. He also narrated historical documentaries for the Biographical series on History Channel, including Johnny Cash: The Man in Black, and General Robert E. Lee.

His only film roles were in the 1976 film Tunnel Vision and as an announcer in 1980's Melvin and Howard starring Jason Robards.

Death
Dark died in Los Angeles of a pulmonary hemorrhage and was interred in Westwood Village Memorial Park Cemetery.

References

External links

 
  Obituary in Variety, June 23, 2004.
 

1938 births
2004 deaths
American male voice actors
Radio and television announcers
CBS people
NBC network announcers
American radio personalities
Respiratory disease deaths in California
Deaths from pulmonary hemorrhage
Male actors from Oklahoma City
Male actors from Tulsa, Oklahoma
Central High School (Tulsa, Oklahoma) alumni
Burials at Westwood Village Memorial Park Cemetery